MDFMK is an album released by industrial rock band MDFMK on March 28, 2000.  It was the only studio album released by the band before it was discontinued and reformed once again as KMFDM.  In a 2003 interview, band leader Sascha Konietzko said the album had sold around 120,000 copies.

Track listing

Personnel 
 Lucia Cifarelli - vocals
 Sascha Konietzko - vocals, percussion, programming
 Tim Skold - vocals, guitar, bass, programming

References 

2000 debut albums
MDFMK albums
Republic Records albums
KMFDM
Industrial rock albums